Algodres, Vale de Alfonsinho e Vilar de Amargo is a civil parish in the municipality of Figueira de Castelo Rodrigo, Portugal. It was formed in 2013 by the merger of the former parishes Algodres, Vale de Alfonsinho and Vilar de Amargo. The population in 2011 was 535, in an area of 72.36 km2.

References

Freguesias of Figueira de Castelo Rodrigo